Poems in Prose is an illustrated collection of prose poems by Clark Ashton Smith. It was released in 1965 and was published by Arkham House in an edition of 1,016 copies.  The book is a nearly complete collection of Smith's prose poetry.

Contents

Poems in Prose contains the following poems:

 "Clark Ashton Smith, Poet in Prose", by Donald S. Fryer
 "The Traveller"
 "The Flower-Devil"
 Images
"Tears"
"The Secret Rose"
"The Wind and the Garden"
"Offerings"
"A Coronal"
 "The Black Lake" 
 Vignettes
"Beyond the Mountains"
"The Broken Lute"
"Nostalgia of the Unknown"
"Grey Sorrow"
"The Hair of Circe"
"The Eyes of Circe"
 "A Dream of Lethe"
 "The Caravan"
 "The Princess Almeena"
 "Ennui"
 "The Statue of Silence"
 "Remoteness"
 "The Memnons of the Night"
 "The Garden and the Tomb"
 "In Cocaigne"
 "The Litany of the Seven Kisses"
 "From a Letter"
 "From the Crypts of Memory"
 "A Phantasy"
 "The Demon, the Angel, and the Beauty"
 "The Shadows"
 "The Crystals"
 "Chinoiserie"
 "The Mirror in the Hall of Ebony"
 "The Muse of Hyperborea"
 "The Lotus and the Moon"
 "The Passing of Aphrodite"
 "To the Daemon"
 "The Forbidden Forest"
 "The Mithridate"
 "Narcissus"
 "The Peril That Lurks Among the Ruins"
 "The Abomination of Desolation"
 "The Touchstone"
 "The Image of Bronze and the Image of Iron"
 "The Corpse and the Skeleton"
 "The Sun and the Sepulchre"
 "Sadastor"

Sources

1965 poetry books
American poetry collections
Arkham House books